Charging is a penalty in ice hockey and ringette. This article deals chiefly with ice hockey.

Rule 42 of the NHL rulebook dictates that charging "shall mean the actions of a player or goalkeeper who, as a result of distance traveled, shall violently check an opponent in any manner. A 'charge' may be the result of a check into the boards, into the goal frame or in open ice." The infraction may warrant any severity of penalty or combination of penalties as the officials deem fit, including a major plus a game misconduct, or suspension if the infraction results in injury to the opposing player.

References

Ice hockey penalties
Violence in ice hockey
Ice hockey terminology